Scott Humphries (born May 26, 1976 in Greeley, Colorado), is a retired professional tennis player from the United States.

Humphries reached a career-high singles ranking of World No. 260, achieved on 9 September 1996. He also reached a career-high doubles ranking of World No. 29, achieved on 30 October 2000.

Humphries won three titles on the ATP Tour across his career with all different partners, in straight sets and on hard courts. Partnering fellow American Justin Gimelstob, Humphries reached the semi-finals of the 2001 Australian Open doubles event, his best performance at a Grand Slam.

Humphries attended Stanford University for a year. He resides in Tampa, Florida  according to the ATP.

Junior career

As a junior, Humphries reach the doubles finals of two Grand Slam tournaments and finished runner up in both. At the 1993 Australian Open alongside compatriot Jimmy Jackson they lost 7–6, 5–7, 2–6 to German duo Lars Rehmann and Christian Tambue, and the then at the 1994 US Open playing with a different compatriot Paul Goldstein they lost to Nicolas Lapentti and Ben Ellwood 0–6, 2–6. Humphries won the 1994 Wimbledon Championships boys' singles title, defeating Mark Philippoussis of Australia 7–6, 3–6, 6–4 in the championship match.

Junior Grand Slam Finals

Singles: 1 (1 title)

Doubles: 2 (2 runner-ups)

ATP Tour career finals

Doubles: 10 (3 titles, 7 runners-up)

ATP Challenger and ITF Futures finals

Doubles: 27 (15–12)

Performance timelines

Singles

Doubles

Mixed doubles

External links
 
 

1976 births
Living people
American male tennis players
People from Greeley, Colorado
Stanford Cardinal men's tennis players
Tennis people from Colorado
Tennis players from Tampa, Florida
Wimbledon junior champions
Grand Slam (tennis) champions in boys' singles